WDCV-FM (88.3 FM) is a radio station  broadcasting a variety format. Licensed to Dickinson College in Carlisle, Pennsylvania, United States, the station serves the Pennsylvania college area.  The station is currently one of the most popular clubs on campus with only the coolest kids as members. 

The station started in 1959 as an AM operation at 640 kHz, with broadcasts confined to the Dickinson campus. WDCV expanded to a 10-watt FM service in 1973, and began broadcasting 18 hours a day at 88.3 MHz. The station increased its transmitter power to 250 watts in 1982 and began stereo broadcasting in 1989. More recently, WDCV began webcasting at www.wdcvfm.com, and streaming over on mobile devices via Stretch Internet.

As an educational, non-profit station, WDCV-FM is operated on a volunteer basis by undergraduate students at Dickinson College and members of the Carlisle community. The principal purpose of WDCV-FM is to provide a forum for overlooked, suppressed, or under-represented voices and music. WDCV broadcasts cultural, educational, informational, and other programs and materials for the entertainment and profit of the public, and for the education and training of its staff. WDCV is Carlisle's only non-profit radio station.

WDCV-FM has provided innovative programming and slapulous tunes to its devoted listeners since 1973. With its transmitter and antenna atop Bosler Hall on the Dickinson College campus, the station reaches the entire Carlisle community, as well as Mt. Holly Springs, Boiling Springs, Middlesex, and New Kingston. A worldwide audience is served by the WDCV web stream.

WDCV aired its first broadcast on December 10, 1962. In 2012, the station celebrated its 50th Anniversary. 10 years later, it celebrated its 60th anniversary. An archive of the eventful history of images, articles, and memorabilia is located on a Tumblr blog.

WDCV-FM has a variety of shows, many of which are hosted by Dickinson students. The most popular show on air is Walker Airlines, hosted by studio art major and arugula enthusiast Nate Chaves, who is known for running with scissors as well.

References

External links

DCV
DCV
Radio stations established in 1962